Tsumkwe Constituency is an electoral constituency in the Otjozondjupa Region of Namibia. It had 8,823 inhabitants in 2004 and 7,075 registered voters . About 2,400 San people live in this constituency.
The constituency consists of the settlement of Tsumkwe and the surrounding rural area. 

Tsumkwe is referred to as a capital city of San people.

Election results

Regional elections
In the 2004 regional election Moses Coma (SWAPO Party) won the by-election over National Unity Democratic Organization (NUDO), Congress of Democrats (CoD), and Democratic Turnhalle Alliance (DTA) candidates.

The 2015 regional election was won by SWAPO's Fransina Ghauzz with 1,554 votes, followed by Ioma Gcao (NUDO) with 720 votes and Samuel R. Maharero (DTA) with 340 votes. The SWAPO candidate also won the 2020 regional election. Johannes Hausiku received 1,249 votes, Samson Ngombe (NUDO) came second with 981 votes.

Presidential elections
In the 2004 presidential election, Tsumkwe helped vote Hifikepunye Pohamba (SWAPO) to power who received 2,372 of the 4,015 votes cast. However, Kuaima Riruako of NUDO received over 21% of the constituency vote, well above his 4.23% nationally.

|-
!style="background-color:#E9E9E9" align=left valign=top|Candidates - Parties
!style="background-color:#E9E9E9" align=right|Votes
!style="background-color:#E9E9E9" align=right|%
|-
|align=left valign=top|Hifikepunye Lucas Pohamba - Swapo party
|valign="top"|2,372
|valign="top"|59.07
|-
|align=left valign=top|Kuaima Riruako - National Unity Democratic Organization 
|valign="top"|846
|valign="top"|21.07
|-
|align=left valign=top|Katuutire Kaura - Democratic Turnhalle Alliance
|valign="top"|484
|valign="top"|12.05
|-
|align=left valign=top|Ben Ulenga - Congress of Democrats
|valign="top"|184
|valign="top"|4.58
|-
|align=left valign=top|Kosie Pretorius - Monitor Action Group
|valign="top"|69
|valign="top"|1.71
|-
|align=left valign=top|Justus ǁGaroëb - United Democratic Front
|valign="top"|44
|valign="top"|1.09
|-
|align=left valign=top|Henk Mudge - Republican Party 
|valign="top"|16
|valign="top"|.03
|-
|align=left style="background-color:#E9E9E9"|Total (turnout 90.47%)
|width="75" align="right" style="background-color:#E9E9E9"|4015
|width="30" align="right" style="background-color:#E9E9E9"|100.0
|-
|align=left colspan=4|Source: Electoral Commission of Namibia
|}

References

Constituencies of Otjozondjupa Region
States and territories established in 1992
1992 establishments in Namibia